National Citizen Party (PNC) was a far-right Chilean political party. It was founded in the La Araucanía Region during 2019 by former National Renewal militants.

The political party was legalized in April 2020. The party was dissolved in February 2022 because it did not receive at least 5% of the votes in the 2021 parliamentary elections to maintain its legality.

Electoral history

Congress election

References

External links
Facebook Official Page 

Right-wing populism in South America
Right-wing populist parties
Conservative parties in Chile
Political parties established in 2019
2019 establishments in Chile
Political parties disestablished in 2022